The Chart Pattana Kla Party is a Thai political party. In 2007 Thai general election, the chairman of the party is Wannarat Channukul. His brother-in-law, the party's "chief advisor" Suwat Liptapanlop is however considered its de facto leader.

History

It was founded under the name of Ruam Jai Thai Chart Pattana ("Thais United National Development Party") as a merger of Thais United and the former National Development Party in September 2007. In the 2007 Thai general election, the party received enough votes to gain eight out of 480 seats in the House of Representatives of Thailand. After 2008, the party was a member of the six-party coalition government led by the Democrat Party's leader, Prime Minister Abhisit Vejjajiva. The party's leader Wannarat Channukul was Minister of Energy in Abhisit's cabinet. The party name was shortened to Ruam Chart Pattana.

In 2011, the Ruam Chart Pattana Party merged with the Puea Pandin Party and changed its name to Chart Pattana Puea Pandin. In the election on 3 July 2011, the party won 7 of the 500 seats in the House of Representatives, five constituency-based and two on the party list. Four of its constituencies are in Nakhon Ratchasima, the party's stronghold and home province of its leaders. After the elections and Pheu Thai Party's victory, the party agreed with Pheu Thai and three other minor parties to form a coalition government under the leadership of Yingluck Shinawatra. Later in 2011, the party name was again simplified to its current version.

Thai tennis player Paradorn Srichaphan an taekwando athlete Yaowapa Boorapolchai joined the Chart Pattana Party to run in the 2011 elections.

Sophon Kaosoo, 50, a Chart Pattana Party candidate was killed while campaigning in the local council elections, due to take place on March 2, 2014. Police believe that the assassination was most likely politically motivated.

Later, at the 2/2022 Extraordinary Annual General Meeting on Monday, September 26, 2022 in Nakhon Ratchasima Province, the meeting resolved to change the party regulations and the name of the party to the Chart Pattana Kla Party. At the same time, there was also a resolution to elect Korn Chatikavanij, former leader of Kla Party, to be a member of the party's executive committee.

References

Political parties in Thailand
Centrist parties in Thailand
Political parties established in 2007